The alternative flatworm mitochondrial code (translation table 14) is a genetic code found in the mitochondria of Platyhelminthes  and Nematodes.

Code

   AAs  = FFLLSSSSYYY*CCWWLLLLPPPPHHQQRRRRIIIMTTTTNNNKSSSSVVVVAAAADDEEGGGG
Starts = -----------------------------------M----------------------------
 Base1 = TTTTTTTTTTTTTTTTCCCCCCCCCCCCCCCCAAAAAAAAAAAAAAAAGGGGGGGGGGGGGGGG
 Base2 = TTTTCCCCAAAAGGGGTTTTCCCCAAAAGGGGTTTTCCCCAAAAGGGGTTTTCCCCAAAAGGGG
 Base3 = TCAGTCAGTCAGTCAGTCAGTCAGTCAGTCAGTCAGTCAGTCAGTCAGTCAGTCAGTCAGTCAG

Bases: adenine (A), cytosine (C), guanine (G) and thymine (T) or uracil (U).

Amino acids: Alanine (Ala, A), Arginine (Arg, R), Asparagine (Asn, N), Aspartic acid (Asp, D), Cysteine (Cys, C), Glutamic acid (Glu, E), Glutamine (Gln, Q), Glycine (Gly, G), Histidine (His, H), Isoleucine (Ile, I), Leucine (Leu, L), Lysine (Lys, K), Methionine (Met, M), Phenylalanine (Phe, F), Proline (Pro, P), Serine (Ser, S), Threonine (Thr, T), Tryptophan (Trp, W), Tyrosine (Tyr, Y), Valine (Val, V)

Differences from the standard code

Systematic range and comments
 Platyhelminthes (flatworms) and Nematoda (roundworms).

Code 14 differs from code 9 (the echinoderm and flatworm mitochondrial code) only by translating UAA to Tyr rather than STOP.  A study in 2000 has found no evidence that the codon UAA codes for Tyr in the flatworms but other opinions exist.  There are very few GenBank records that are translated with code 14 but a test translation shows that re-translating these records with code 9 can cause premature terminations.  More recently, UAA has been found to code for tyrosine in the nematodes Radopholus similis and Radopholus arabocoffeae.

See also
 List of genetic codes

References

Molecular genetics
Gene expression
Protein biosynthesis